The Wesleyan Methodist Church was a Methodist denomination in the United States organized on May 13, 1841.

It was composed of ministers and laypeople who withdrew from the Methodist Episcopal Church because of disagreements regarding slavery, church government, and interpretations of the doctrine of entire sanctification, according to the  Discipline of the Wesleyan Methodist Connection, although later editions of the Discipline cite only the first two reasons. The first secessions in 1841 took place in Michigan although the new church group was formalized in Utica, New York. In November 1842, Orange Scott, La Roy Sunderland and J. Horton seceded from the Methodist Episcopal Church for reasons given in their publication of the True Wesleyan. The first general conference was held in Utica, NY, in October 1844.

The Wesleyan Methodist Church fell into the category of Holiness Methodist Pacifists, as it opposed war as documented in its Book of Disciplines, which stated that the Gospel is in "every way opposed to the practice of War in all its forms; and those customs which tend to foster and perpetuate war spirit, [are] inconsistent with the benevolent designs of the Christian religion."  They also cited tolerance of the Methodist Episcopal Church of "so horrible a crime" as slavery as a reason for their secession.

The Wesleyan Methodist Church merged with the Pilgrim Holiness Church in 1968, and became known as The Wesleyan Church. This was largely driven by the trend toward denominational mergers during the 1960s and the belief their similarities were greater than their differences.  As such, they believed they could be more effective becoming one group. Several conferences in both merging denominations refused to be a part of the merged church over differences about modesty and worldliness (some of the conferences did not permit their members to have television sets, and required the women to have uncut hair in keeping with their interpretation of ). One of the largest conferences which refused to join the merger was the Allegheny Conference with over 100 churches. It became the Allegheny Wesleyan Methodist Connection of Churches, and most of the churches are still known as Wesleyan Methodist, e.g. Salem Wesleyan Methodist Church. Other Wesleyan Methodists who dissented with the merger organized into the Bible Methodist Connection of Churches and the Bible Methodist Connection of Tennessee.

See also 
List of Methodist denominations
Primitive Methodist Church
Wesleyan Methodist Church (Seneca Falls, New York)

References 

Methodist denominations
Methodist denominations in North America
Holiness denominations
History of Methodism in the United States
Former Methodist denominations
Religious organizations established in 1841
1841 establishments in the United States
Holiness pacifism